Calodesma uraneides is a moth of the family Erebidae. It was described by Arthur Gardiner Butler in 1871. It is found in French Guiana.

References

Calodesma
Moths described in 1871